Joseph Edward Kurtz (born August 18, 1946) is an American prelate of the Roman Catholic Church who served as the archbishop of the Archdiocese of Louisville in Kentucky from 2007 to 2022. He previously served as the bishop of the Diocese of Knoxville in Tennessee from 1999 to 2007. Kurtz was president of the United States Conference of Catholic Bishops (USCCB) from 2013 to 2016.

Biography

Early life 
Joseph Kurtz was born on August 18, 1946, in Mahanoy City, Pennsylvania, to George and Stella (née Zmijewski) Kurtz. He is of Polish descent. One of five children (Rose Marie, Theresa, George, and Patricia), he entered St. Charles Borromeo Seminary in Philadelphia in 1964.  He obtained a Bachelor of Philosophy degree and a Master of Divinity degree from that school.

Priesthood 
Kurtz was ordained to the priesthood for the Diocese of Allentown by Bishop Joseph McShea on March 18, 1972.  Kurtz completed his post-graduate work at Marywood University in Scranton, earning a Master of Social Work degree.

During his priestly ministry, Kurtz served as high school teacher, college lecturer, administrator, and pastor in Catasauqua and Bethlehem, both in Pennsylvania. He was raised to the rank of Monsignor in 1986.

Bishop of Knoxville 
On October 26, 1999, Kurtz was appointed as the second bishop of the Diocese of Knoxville by Pope John Paul II. He received his episcopal consecration on December 8. 1999. from Archbishop Gabriel Higuera, with Archbishop Thomas Kelly and Bishop Edward Cullen serving as co-consecrators, before an audience of approximately 5,000 at the Knoxville Convention Center in Knoxville.

Archbishop of Louisville
Kurtz was named archbishop of the Archdiocese of Louisville on June 12, 2007 by Pope Benedict XVI. His installation took place on August 15, 2007, at Louisville Gardens in Louisville.

In addition to his diocesan duties, Kurtz served as chair of the USCCB Committee on Marriage and Family Life. He was elected as the vice president of the USCCB in November 2010. On November 11, 2013, Kurtz was elected USCCB president.  On February 19, 2014, Kurtz was appointed a member of the Congregation for the Oriental Churches.On November 14, 2014, he was elected as a delegate to the 2015 Synod of Bishops on the Family, pending Vatican approval.

On February 1, 2019, Kurtz released a report that named 22 priests from the archdiocese with credible accusations of sexual abuse. The report was prepared by an independent investigator who was not part of the church. None of the 22 men were active priests in 2019.

In July 2019, Kurtz underwent treatment for urothelial cancer, which required a three-month medical leave of absence from the archdiocese.

Retirement 
On February 8, 2022, Pope Francis accepted Kurtz's letter of resignation as archbishop of the Archdiocese of Louisville.

Doctrinal positions

Kurtz is generally seen as a conservative and a firm follower of Vatican directives on doctrine and liturgy. The Rev. Thomas J. Reese indicates that Kurtz is a "smiling conservative" like Archbishop Timothy M. Dolan, who is "very gracious but still holds the same positions" as a cleric like Archbishop Charles J. Chaput, who has openly criticized Catholic politicians who support abortion rights for women.

References

External links
Roman Catholic Archdiocese of Louisville Official Site

1946 births
Living people
American people of Polish descent
Marywood University alumni
Members of the Congregation for the Oriental Churches
Roman Catholic Archdiocese of Louisville
Catholic Church in Kentucky
Catholic Church in Tennessee
Roman Catholic Diocese of Knoxville
Religious leaders from Kentucky
Religious leaders from Tennessee
20th-century Roman Catholic bishops in the United States
21st-century Roman Catholic archbishops in the United States